Nonadecylic acid, or nonadecanoic acid, is a 19-carbon saturated fatty acid with the chemical formula . It forms salts called nonadecylates. Nonadecylic acid can be found in fats and vegetable oils, although it is rare.

It is also present in the world of insects as the major constituent of the substance secreted by soldiers of the termite Rhinotermes marginalis for defence purposes.

Nonadecanoic acid has found applications in the field of metal lubrication.

The compound can be prepared by permanganate oxidation of 1-eicosene.

See also
List of saturated fatty acids

References

Fatty acids
Alkanoic acids